Freestone County is a county in the east-central part of the U.S. state of Texas.  As of the 2020 census, its population was 19,435. Its county seat is Fairfield. The county was created in 1850 and organized the next year.

History

Native Americans

Archeological evidence of the farming Kichai band of the Caddoan Mississippian culture dates to 200 BCE in the area.

The Hernando de Soto expedition of 1541 resulted in violent encounters with the Caddo Native Americans who occupied the area. Spanish and French missionaries carried smallpox, measles, malaria, and influenza as endemic diseases; the Caddo suffered epidemics, as they had no acquired immunity to these new diseases.  Eventually, the Caddo were forced to reservations.

The Tawakoni branch of Wichita Indians originated as a tribe north of Texas, but migrated south into East Texas. From 1843 onward, the Tawakoni were part of treaties made by both the Republic of Texas and the United States.  The name of the Tawakoni was also sometimes spelled as Tehuacana.

County established

In 1826, empresario David G. Burnet received a grant from the Coahuila y Tejas legislature to settle 300 families. By contracting how many families each grantee could settle, the government sought to have some control over colonization.

The threat of Indian hostilities kept most from homesteading in Freestone County until the Treaty of Bird's Fort. Within three years of the treaty, colonization, primarily from Southern states, had been so successful that the counties surrounding Freestone had already been organized. In 1850, the Texas Legislature formed Freestone County from Limestone County. Freestone is a descriptive name referring to the quality of the soil. The county was organized in 1851. Fairfield was designated as the county seat. Of the county's total 1860 population of 6,881, more than half (3,613) were slaves.

Freestone County voted 585–3 in favor of secession from the Union. After the Civil War, while the loss of slave labor may have hurt the planters in the local county economy, by the end of Reconstruction, the number of farms doubled, with more smaller farms than before the war. Continuing economic and social tensions after Reconstruction resulted in Whites lynching Blacks to keep them in place as second-class citizens. Freestone County had nine such lynchings from 1877 into the early 20th century, most around the turn of the century. This was the fifth-highest total in the state, tied with that of Grimes County, Texas.

The Houston and Texas Central Railway was constructed to skirt the county to the west and south in 1870, giving the local economy a boost. and the International – Great Northern Railroad The Trinity and Brazos Valley Railway, laid track across the county in 1906, helping the growing economy.

The Prohibition Eighteenth Amendment to the United States Constitution took effect in 1920, banning the sale, manufacturing, and transportation of alcoholic beverages for public consumption. In the period until its repeal by the Twenty-first Amendment to the United States Constitution in 1933, some enterprising individuals in Freestone followed a national trend and began bootlegging for profit. This illegal activity put food on the table for some people during a period when the local economy was in a downward slide.

In 1969, the Texas Utilities Generating Company located a new power plant near Fairfield called Big Brown Power Plant. A dam was built to create Fairfield Lake to provide stored water for a cooling system for the plant. Fairfield Lake State Park was established around the lake and opened to the public in 1976.  Big Brown was shut down in February 2018.

Geography

Major highways
  Interstate 45
  U.S. Highway 79
  U.S. Highway 84
  U.S. Highway 287
  State Highway 14
  State Highway 75
  State Highway 164
  State Highway 179

Adjacent counties
 Henderson County (north)
 Anderson County (northeast)
 Leon County (southeast)
 Limestone County (southwest)
 Navarro County (northwest)

Demographics

Note: the US Census treats Hispanic/Latino as an ethnic category. This table excludes Latinos from the racial categories and assigns them to a separate category. Hispanics/Latinos can be of any race.

As of the census of 2010,  19,816 people, 6,588 households, and 4,664 families were residing in the county.  The population density was 20 people/sq mi (8/km2). The 8,138 housing units averaged 9/sq mi (4/km2).

The racial makeup of the county was 73.1% White, 16.1% African American, 0.7% Native American, 0.3% Asian, 8.1% from other races, and 1.6% from two or more races. About 13.6% of the population were Hispanic or Latino of any race.

Of the 7,259 households, 28% had children under 18 living with them, 54.5% were married couples living together, 10.5% had a female householder with no husband present, and 30.6% were not families. About 27% of all households were made up of individuals, and 12.4% had someone living alone who was 65 or older.  The average household size was 2.51, and the average family size was 3.05.

In the county, the age distribution was 23.6% under 18, 8.9% from 18 to 24, 28.1% from 25 to 44, 23.0% from 45 to 64, and 16.4% who were 65 or older. The median age was 38 years. For every 100 females there were 110.50 males. For every 100 females age 18 and over, there were 110.80 males.

The median income for a household in the county was $44,560, and for a family was $59,696. Males had a median income of $30,633 versus $19,214 for females. The per capita income for the county was $16,338.  About 9.80% of families and 14.20% of the population were below the poverty line, including 16.80% of those under age 18 and 14.30% of those age 65 or over.

Media
Freestone County is currently listed as part of the Dallas-Fort Worth DMA, although it is located in eastern Central Texas, geographically closer to the Waco metropolitan area.  Local media outlets include: KDFW-TV, KXAS-TV, WFAA-TV, KTVT-TV, KERA-TV, KTXA-TV, KDFI-TV, KDAF-TV, and KFWD-TV, and all of the Waco/Temple/Killeen market stations also provide coverage for Freestone County. They include: KCEN-TV, KWTX-TV, KXXV-TV,KAKW-TV and KWKT-TV.

The Freestone County Times and The Fairfield Recorder newspapers serve the county.  The Teague Chronicle is the hometown newspaper of Teague (Freestone County), Texas, and has served Teague and Freestone Counties for over a century.

Communities

Cities
 Fairfield (county seat)
 Teague

Towns
 Kirvin
 Oakwood (mostly in Leon County)
 Streetman (small part in Navarro County)
 Wortham

Unincorporated communities
 Butler
 Dew
 Donie
 Freestone

Ghost town
 Coutchman

Notable residents

 Leonard Davis (born 1978), NFL offensive lineman for the Dallas Cowboys, grew up in Wortham.
 Blind Lemon Jefferson (18931929), blues musician, was born near Wortham.
 Washington Phillips (18801954), gospel blues musician, was born in the county.
 George Watkins (190070), Major League Baseball player who owns the record for highest batting average as a rookie, was born in the county.

Politics

See also

 National Register of Historic Places listings in Freestone County, Texas
 Recorded Texas Historic Landmarks in Freestone County

References

External links
 
 Freestone County government's website
 
 See a  map, Freestone County / sponsored by Freestone County Historical Survey Committee. hosted by the Portal to Texas History.
 Freestone County Times homepage

 
1851 establishments in Texas
Populated places established in 1851